James Singer may refer to:

 James Singer (bishop) (1786–1866), Irish Anglican bishop
 Jimmy Singer (1937–2010), Welsh footballer